Arene curacoana is a species of sea snail, a marine gastropod mollusk in the family Areneidae.

Description

The shell can grow to be 3.4 mm in length.

Distribution 
Arene curacoana can be found off of Curaçao, Bonair, and Saint Vincent.

References

External links
 To Encyclopedia of Life
 To World Register of Marine Species

Areneidae
Gastropods described in 1934